Margaretting is a village and civil parish in the Chelmsford district, in the county of Essex, England. The population of the village taken at the 2011 Census was 847.

The village is located on the B1002 road approximately four miles from Chelmsford (the county town of Essex) and two miles from the village of Ingatestone.  It is near the River Wid.

Amenities 

The 15th century St Margaret's church is situated about a mile from the village.

Margaretting has a primary school.  The village hall and playing field are situated in Wantz Road and host local football.

There are currently two public houses, the Black Bull and the Red Lion; a third, the Spread Eagle, was closed following fire damage.

Transport 
Margaretting lies on the B1002 road which links to the A414 road towards Chelmsford and is bypassed by the A12 road.  The village is served by buses between Brentwood and Chelmsford and the closest rail service is from Ingatestone railway station.

Nearby settlements 
Nearby settlements include the towns of Chelmsford and Ingatestone and the hamlet of Margaretting Tye.

References 

Villages in Essex
Civil parishes in Essex